Mario Armano (born 25 July 1946) is a retired Italian bobsledder who competed in the late 1960s and early 1970s. Competing in two Winter Olympics, he won a gold medal in the four-man event at Grenoble in 1968.

Armano also won four medals at the FIBT World Championships with two golds (Two-man: 1971, Four-man: 1970), one silver (Four-man: 1969), and one bronze (Two-man: 1969).

References
 Bobsleigh four-man Olympic medalists for 1924, 1932-56, and since 1964
 Bobsleigh two-man world championship medalists since 1931
 Wallenchinsky, David (1984). "Bobsled: Four-man". In The Complete Book of the Olympics: 1896 - 1980. New York: Penguin Books. p. 561.

Bobsledders at the 1968 Winter Olympics
Bobsledders at the 1972 Winter Olympics
Italian male bobsledders
Olympic bobsledders of Italy
Olympic gold medalists for Italy
Living people
1946 births
Olympic medalists in bobsleigh
Medalists at the 1968 Winter Olympics